Cousances-les-Forges is a commune in the Meuse department in Grand Est in north-eastern France.

See also 
Communes of the Meuse department

References

Cousanceslesforges